The 1852 United States presidential election in Kentucky took place on November 2, 1852, as part of the 1852 United States presidential election. Voters chose 12 representatives, or electors to the Electoral College, who voted for President and Vice President.

Kentucky voted for the Whig candidate, Winfield Scott, over Democratic candidate Franklin Pierce. Scott won Kentucky by a margin of 3.12%.

Kentucky was one of the four states to vote for Scott in the 1852 election with the other three being Massachusetts, Tennessee and Vermont.

With 51.44% of the popular vote, Kentucky would prove to be Scott's strongest victory in the nation.

Results

References

Kentucky
1852
1852 Kentucky elections